Matthew Tyson Yates was a Baptist Christian missionary who served with the American Southern Baptist Mission during the late Qing Dynasty in China.

Works authored or edited

References

Notes

Baptist missionaries in China
Christian writers
Baptist missionaries from the United States
Southern Baptists
American expatriates in China